North Grenville is a township in eastern Ontario, Canada, in the United Counties of Leeds and Grenville on the Rideau River. It is located just south of Ottawa in Canada's National Capital Region.

It was established on January 1, 1998, through the amalgamation of Oxford-on-Rideau Township, South Gower Township, and the Town of Kemptville. In 2003, a motion of the municipal council adopted the designation of 'municipality'.

The largest community in North Grenville is Kemptville, with a population of 3,911 in the 2016 census, up from 3,620 in the Canada 2011 Census.

Communities
The municipality comprises the communities of Actons Corners, Bedell, Bishops Mills, Burritts Rapids (the oldest community on the Rideau River), East Oxford, Heckston, Hutchins Corners, Kemptville, McReynolds, Millars Corners, Mountain, Newmanville, Oxford Mills, Oxford Station, Pattersons Corners, Peltons Corners, Sabourins Crossing, Schipaville, Swan Crossing and Van Allens. The administrative offices of the municipality are located in Kemptville.

Demographics 

See also
List of townships in Ontario
North Grenville District High School

References

External links

Lower-tier municipalities in Ontario
Municipalities in Leeds and Grenville United Counties